Mohamed Hassan Abdelmoaty Mohamed (Arabic : محمد حسن عبد المعطي محمد أمين )(born August 3, 1991)  known professionally as Mizo Amin is a professional basketball player, who is currently the team captain of both Al Rayyan Sports Club and Qatar's national basketball team, participating at FIBA Asia championships.

He represented Qatar's national basketball team at the 2016 FIBA Asia Challenge in Tehran, Iran. There, he was his team's top scorer.

References

External links
 Asia-basket.com Profile
 2016 FIBA Asia Challenge Profile
 2015 FIBA Asia Championship Profile

Guards (basketball)
Forwards (basketball)
Qatari men's basketball players
Qatari people of Egyptian descent
Sportspeople from Cairo
1991 births
Living people
Basketball players at the 2014 Asian Games
Basketball players at the 2018 Asian Games
Asian Games competitors for Qatar